The Murray Island Formation is a geologic formation in Ontario. It preserves fossils dating back to the Devonian period.

See also

 List of fossiliferous stratigraphic units in Ontario

References
 

Devonian Ontario
Devonian southern paleotemperate deposits